Arthur Fagan (10 December 1890 – 8 July 1977) was a British fencer. He competed in the individual foil event at the 1912 Summer Olympics.

References

1890 births
1977 deaths
British male fencers
Olympic fencers of Great Britain
Fencers at the 1912 Summer Olympics
Sportspeople from Chertsey